There were several origin stories of the Gothic peoples recorded by Latin and Greek authors in late antiquity (roughly 3rd–8th centuries AD), and these are relevant not only to the study of literature, but also by historians seeking evidence of real historical events involving the Goths and other peoples mentioned in these stories.

The earliest accounts of Gothic origins were influenced by biblical commentary, and the assumption that the Goths were related to peoples who had lived earlier in the same region north of the Black Sea and Lower Danube, especially the Getae, and Scythians. The three most important surviving histories of the Goths in late antiquity are those by Jordanes, Isidore of Seville, and Procopius, although Jordanes focused especially on the Amal clan's supposed history, and Procopius focused less on early origins than the other two.

Jordanes' Getica has been categorized among the most important examples of the origo gentis (origin of a people) genre of literature as understood for example by historian Herwig Wolfram, but whether this category should be described as a genre is questioned, for example by Walter Goffart, because of doubts that the authors understood themselves to be following a shared traditional model.

Goths as Scythians, Getae and descendants of Magog
The Goths, and other Gothic peoples such as the Gepids, lived north of the Roman empire's frontier on the Lower Danube in an area which had previously been home to Getae, Dacians, and Sarmatians, and much earlier by the Scythians. All of the surviving Gothic origins stories included elements which connected the Goths to at least some of these previous inhabitants of "Scythia".

Already in the first half of the third century, Dexippos, whose history has only survived in fragments, referred to the Goths of his time as Scythians, although from the surviving fragments he did not necessarily intend to assert that all Scythians had common origins.

The first surviving rationales equating Goths with Scythians or Getae were by early Christian scholars, Ambrose (about 340–397), Orosius (about 375–420) and Jerome (about 347–420). Ambrose equated the Scythians and Goths with the Biblical Gog and Magog, barbarians who come from the extreme north, where there are islands.

Ambrose, in his De Fide II.xvi explains that "Gog" the ruler of "Magog" mentioned in the Book of Ezekiel represented "the Goths" (hoc est Gothis), as the subject of a prophecy in the Bible of an invader from the north, who will come on horseback as a mighty army, and be defeated. Gog and Magog were also associated with islands because God would "send fire on Magog, and among them that dwell carelessly in the isles".

According to Arne S. Christensen, one precursor of Ambrose's equation of the Goths with the Biblical Gog and Magog was Josephus (died about 100), who equated the Scythians with the descendants of biblical Magog, who he understood as a person, not a country. This was based upon a passage in the Book of Genesis. A connection between this ancestral Genesis Magog, and the prophesied Gog from Ezekiel, who ruled a country named Magog, or "Gog and Magog" from the similar 1st century AD Book of Revelation prophecy, was made explicit in Jerome. This paved the way for other writers to connect the Goths, as Scythians, to the ancestry of the Scythians as described by Josephus, although Jerome himself did not do this.

Orosius is among early writers to equate the Goths with Scythians, listing them along with the Huns and Alans as "Scythians" of his time.

Jerome, like his contemporary Orosius, equated the Goths to the earlier Getae, but did not equate them to Gog and Magog. Jerome stated that scholars before him and Orosius had made this equation. Saint Jerome however specifically rejected this equation of the Goths with Gog and Magog. (Nevertheless, Herwig Wolfram believes that with this assertion "he probably invented the identification of the Goths as Getae".) Their contemporary, Saint Augustine, argued that Gog and Magog should not be read as Ambrose had, as Goths, but seen as representing peoples all over the world, not any single specific barbarian people.

Another late 4th century writer who routinely called the Goths "Getae" was the poet Claudian (died about 404).

Much later, Isidore of Seville (died 636), in his own History of the Goths, suggested that the connection of the Goths to Magog in Ezekiel must have been assumed by previous authors because of the similarity in sound between "Gog" and "Goth". Similarly, he noted that the word for the Scythians (Skuthoi in transliterated Greek), was itself also similar to the name of the Goths (Guthoi). Isidore did not see these similarities of names as false leads, believing that these indicated the true origins of the Goths.

Procopius
Procopius called the Goths "Getae" without giving any particular justification for this. More unusually, he avoided using the term Scythian for the Goths, which he used as a more general term. Instead he asserted that the Gothic peoples, among whom he listed not only the Goths but also the Gepids and Vandals, had once been known to writers as the Sarmatians, and also, further back, as the less well-known Melanchlaeni or "black cloaks". Herodotus had specifically described these latter as a non-Scythian people, who had once lived very distant from the Greeks, beyond the Scythians of his time. Procopius specified that some people called the Gothic peoples "Getan people". They were all similar-looking, Arian by religion (in the 6th century) and spoke a language known to Procopius as Gothic.

Jordanes
Similar to older accounts, Jordanes' Getica equates the Goths to Getae, and believed they were descended from the Scythians, with ancient origins in the far north. For his equation of the Getae and the Goths, even in the title of his work, he explicitly cited the authority of Orosius. Jordanes had read Josephus and apparently saw his account of the origins of the Scythians as descendants of the Biblical Magog in Genesis as compatible with his own account, though he questioned why Josephus had not specifically named the Goths and discussed their beginnings.

Differently to other Gothic origins stories however, Jordanes named at least two specific northern places where the ancestors of the Goths had lived more than a thousand years earlier.

Scholars are uncertain about the precise origins of the various details of Jordanes' migration stories, and debate the extent to which real Gothic legends or the study of older Christian and pagan authors may have influenced it. Jordanes himself, in the prefaces to his Romana and Getica, mentions that his project of writing the Getica involved first reading the now lost, and much larger (12 volume) history of the Goths written by Cassiodorus, in Italy. Indeed, he had been asked by a friend to abridge it. He had access to it for three days, he said.

In the time of Jordanes, the Goths lived mainly in or near the Roman empire itself. He reported several ancestral homelands in his migration narrative which stretched over thousands of years.

Scandza

The opening sections of the Getica form a large digression about the large northern island in the Baltic sea known as "Scandza" to Jordanes. He is understood by modern scholars to have intended the peninsula of Scandinavia. According to Jordanes (IV 25, XVII 94), the Goths left this island in two boats, along with one boat of Gepids, 2030 years before 540, or 1490 BCE.

Jordanes, apparently influenced by the earlier Bible-influenced stories of Scythian origins, created an influential narrative in this section whereby Scandza was a "womb of nations", claiming that many nations had spread from there in large numbers. He also gives a remarkable list of peoples who Jordanes believed lived in Scandza during his own time. It has been suggested that he (like his contemporary Procopius, and the earlier Cassiodorus) had an interest in collecting information about the northern regions.

The name "Scandza" can be found in earlier Greek geographers such as Pliny the Elder and Ptolemy, and Jordanes explicitly mentions having used such sources. This raises the possibility that Jordanes used a name from his reading of Roman and Greek authors, in order to add detail to an older idea of a northern origin for the Scythians.

Vistula region

After Scandza, Jordanes says the Goths lived in an area near the Vistula river. Jordanes wrote that in 1490 BC, they were led by a king named Berig, in two ships, and settled at a place Jordanes believed was called Gothiscandza in his time. The Gepids, who travelled behind them in another ship, settled on an island in the Vistula previously called Spesis, and later called Gepedoius (XVII 96). According to Jordanes, the Goths lived there for the reigns of about 5 kings, starting in about 1490 BC — a period long before Jordanes, and long before the Roman empire existed.

According to Jordanes, the Goths then moved to takeover the coastal region where the Ulmerugi lived. Modern historians have suggested that this name may refer to the Rugii, who had been reported by the Roman author Tacitus as living in this area about 100 AD. One of the neighbours of these people who Tacitus mentions were the Gutones, whose name is apparently quite similar to some forms of the Goth's own name in their own language. Ptolemy also mentioned these Gutones and placed them close to the Vistula. This again raises the question of whether Jordanes (or a source of his) had developed this part of the narrative based on old Roman works.

In the case of the Gutones mentioned by Pliny the Elder, Tacitus and Ptolemy, while Jordanes may well have been adapting the works of older authors, and using an unbelievable chronology, many historians believe that there was a real connection between them and the Goths. Not only the name, but also archaeological evidence favours the idea. In particular, there are similarities between the Vistula Wielbark culture, which is believed to have included the Gutones, and the Ukrainian Chernyakhov culture, which is believed to have included the Gothic peoples ancestral to those known to Jordanes and his contemporaries.

Among scholars who accept a connection between the Vistula Gutones and the Scythia Goths, there are a wide range of opinions about the details. In particular, there are doubts about whether a large number of people moved, and if so, whether they stayed together as one continuous ethnic group.

Jordanes appears to have also made use of contemporary sources familiar with northern geography. For example, he says that Gothiscandza still has the same name (IV 25), and the Gepid island of Spesis was in his own time inhabited by the otherwise unknown Vividarii, who he described as a mix of different peoples (XVII 96).

Scythia and the Lower Danube

Prior to their entanglements with Rome, Jordanes (V 38) describes the Goths as having moved around between different parts of Scythia and Dacia, all north of the Danube and Black Sea.

The first, Oium, was a fertile area of Scythia where the Goths fought and defeated the previous inhabitants of that area, the Spali (a people apparently mentioned by Pliny the Elder as living on or near the Don river). Jordanes believed that the Goths had first arrived with an army and families in one specific fertile part of Scythia, as one people. Specifically, Jordanes says that "Oium" was their name for Scythia, or this fertile part of it.
Second, they hastened to an area near the Sea of Azov ("Lake Maeotis"). Jordanes specifies that after defeating the Spali, the Goths hastened to their new homeland in Scythia. Jordanes mentions that this part of his narrative agrees with the work of a lost chronicler of the Goths called Ablabius, and (in a well-known comment) "the ancient Gothic songs, which are almost historical in nature".  Jordanes (V) describes this region as being a bend of Sea of Azov, between the rivers Dniepr and Don. During their long stay here, these Scythian Goths supposedly battled against Egyptian and Middle Eastern empires, creating the Median empire, some Goths became the ancestors of the Parthians (V-VI). Some of the Gothic women, when carried away, became the Amazons and held the kingdoms of Asia for almost a year before returning to the Goths (VII).
Third, for a very long period they lived in Moesia, Thrace and Dacia, areas found near the Lower Danube and Balkans, and bordering the Graeco-Roman world. In this period, Jordanes equates the Goths with historical Dacians and Getae, long before the time of Jordanes. He reports for example (IX) that in the time of the Trojan War, the Goths (now Getae) ruled a kingdom at Moesia. The 5th century BC Thracian king Sitalces is also described as a Gothic king (X 66). Jordanes also emphasizes (V.39) several important kings who made the Goths wiser: Zeuta, Dicineus, and Zalmoxis. Zalmoxis was reported as a Getic deity by Herodotus already in the 5th century BC. Strabo had believed that Zalmoxis was a slave of Pythagoras, and mentioned Decaeneus as a Dacian disciple living in the much later time of the Dacian king Burebista, and Jordanes makes it clear he means the same person, despite the impossible chronology. Jordanes even specified that the Gothic order of "capillati" or long-haired men, was instituted by this Dicineus, and that the laws he made for the Goths were still in existence in his time.
Finally, Jordanes says the Goths moved back east to the region north of the Black Sea ("Pontus"). This is an area where Roman and Greek sources report them in the 3rd and 4th centuries.

The chronology of Jordanes is not considered realistic.

Notes

Bibliography
 

Goths
History of literature
Folklore
Historiography
Origin hypotheses of ethnic groups
6th-century Latin writers
6th-century Byzantine writers